Idala was a locality situated in Lund Municipality, Skåne County, Sweden with 738 inhabitants in 2010. It was merged into Veberöd in 2015.

References 

Populated places in Skåne County
Populated places in Lund Municipality